Hayfield is a civil parish in the High Peak district of Derbyshire, England.  The parish contains 58 listed buildings that are recorded in the National Heritage List for England.  Of these, one is listed at Grade II*, the middle of the three grades, and the others are at Grade II, the lowest grade.  The parish contains the village of Hayfield, the smaller settlements of Little Hayfield and Rowarth, and the surrounding countryside and moorland.  Most of the listed buildings are houses, cottages and associated structures, farmhouses and farm buildings.  The other listed buildings include a church and a chapel, a packhorse bridge and a road bridge, a hotel and a public house.


Key

Buildings

References

Citations

Sources

 

Lists of listed buildings in Derbyshire